The XM913 is an experimental American chain gun produced at Picatinny Arsenal. The cannon is a larger and more modern version of the 25 mm Bushmaster cannon. Although its shells, 50 x 228 mm, are twice the diameter of the 25×137mm M242 Bushmaster, the 50mm cannon is not much longer than the smaller weapon.

Ammunition 

The XM1204 High Explosive Air Burst round is programmable. The gunner can select from three detonation modes.   
 When in point detonate mode the projectile's high explosive detonates when it hits a target.   
 In point detonate delay mode the high explosive detonates a brief instant after it hits a target.  The delay is intended to let the projectile first penetrate a wall, and explode when it emerges on the other side.
 In air burst mode the cannon's aiming system programs the munition to explode in the air above the target.  When the gunner aims his or her sight on the desired target, and presses their trigger halfway, the aiming system calculates the range to the target. They can then raise their sight slightly above the target, and when they pull the trigger all the way the aiming system will instruct the round to explode in the air above the target. Enemies hiding behind an obstacle can then be killed or wounded without blowing a hole through the obstacle.

The XM1203 Armor Piercing Fin Stabilized Discarding Sabot with Trace. The projectile itself is 50 mm in diameter, encasing a long thin dart, designed to pierce armored vehicles. A light "sabot" grips the barrel's rifling, in order for the shell gets the full power of the expanding gas. Tracer rounds have a button of pyrotechnic chemical that leaves a trail to help a gunner observe the fall of shot.

References

50 mm artillery
Vehicle weapons
Post–Cold War weapons of the United States
Autocannon